White War is a 2020 action crime drama web television series produced by Lam Kwok Wah. The series stars Bosco Wong, Ron Ng, Kenny Kwan, Yazhuo Zhang, Chrissie Chau, and Karena Ng. It follows the story of three Hong Kong narcotics police officers. 

Distributed by Tencent Penguin Pictures and Ledo Entertainment, the series premiered on 9 July 2020 on Tencent Video, Youku, iQiyi, and Viu. Production began April 2019 and concluded in July, with locations in Hong Kong and Thailand.

Synopsis 
Cheng Tian (Ron Ng), Wei Jun Xuan (Bosco Wong), and Xu Xiu Ping (Kenny Kwan) grew up like brothers, and the three loyal friends join the HK Police Force together, specializing in anti-narcotics cases. While they were meant to reunite after busting a large-scale drug ring, Cheng Tian and Xiu Ping discover that Jun Xuan, who had gone undercover, has returned a changed person. Xiu Ping gets framed by a gang, pushing him to join hands with the corrupted Jun Xuan out of resentment. The drug war in South East Asia intensifies as a new generation of drug lords gain power and Jun Xuan clashes with Thai drug lords. The three friends find themselves in two different worlds and their brotherhood is put to test in the face of greed and corruption.

Cast

Main 

 Bosco Wong as Wei Jun Xian (Turbo)
 Ron Ng as Ching Tian
 Kenny Kwan as Xu Xiu Ping
 Yazhuo Zhang as Wu Jiawen (Carmen)
 Karena Ng as Zhao Ying Ying

Recurring 

Evergreen Mak as Ku Wai Chung 
 Peter Pang as He Zong Tai
 Cheng Shu Fung as Zhao Guo Ji 
 Leonon as Wen Long
 Chrissie Chau as Wang Zhiqi
 Vincent Lam as Mo Yao Qiang
 Sheldon Lo as Huo Ji
 Kui Ma as Teddy 
 Chun Kit Chang as Tung

Special guest star 

 Gallen Lo as Chen Jian

Other 

 Jacquelin Ch'ng as Miss Ma 
 Q Bobo as Cai Yi Bo
 Law Lan as mother of He Zong Tai
 Alan Wan as Mr. Chan 
 Harriet Yeung as Zhen
 Heidi Lee as Coco
 Shing Mak 
 Karen Lee as Tina 
 Rosanne Lui as mother of Xiu Ping
 Willie Lau as father of Xiu Ping
 Lam Chi Pok as Xiu Ping's brother

References 

Chinese drama television series
2020 Chinese television series debuts
Hong Kong crime television series